Marion Jones won the singles tennis title of the 1902 U.S. Women's National Singles Championship by defeating reigning champion Elisabeth Moore 6–1, 1–0, in the challenge round. Moore was unwell during the challenge match and partially fainted at the beginning of the second set due to the onset of a high fever and subsequently had to default. Jones had won the right to challenge Moore by defeating Carrie Neely 8–6, 6–4 in the final of the All Comers' competition. The event was played on outdoor grass courts and held at the Philadelphia Cricket Club in Wissahickon Heights, Chestnut Hill, Philadelphia from June 24 through June 27, 1902.

The United States National Lawn Tennis Association (USNLTA) changed the format for the matches from best-of-five to best-of-three sets.

Draw

Challenge round

All Comers' finals

References

1902
1902 in American women's sports
June 1902 sports events
Women's Singles
1902 in women's tennis
Chestnut Hill, Philadelphia
1902 in sports in Pennsylvania
Women's sports in Pennsylvania